Larbi El Hadi (born 27 May 1961) is an Algerian football goalkeeper who played for Algeria in the 1986 FIFA World Cup. He played in Algeria's opening match versus Northern Ireland and came on in the 20th minute as a substitute in the third match versus Spain, replacing Nacerdine Drid. He also played for NA Hussein Dey, WA Boufarik, JS Kabylie and Tunisian club ES Zarzis.

References

External links
FIFA profile

1961 births
Living people
Footballers from Algiers
Algerian footballers
Algerian expatriate footballers
Algeria international footballers
Association football goalkeepers
1982 African Cup of Nations players
1986 FIFA World Cup players
Competitors at the 1987 Mediterranean Games
1990 African Cup of Nations players
Africa Cup of Nations-winning players
NA Hussein Dey players
JS Kabylie players
ES Zarzis players
Expatriate footballers in Tunisia
WA Boufarik players
Mediterranean Games competitors for Algeria
21st-century Algerian people